Katter is a surname. Notable people with the surname include:

 Berndt Katter (born 1932), athlete
 Bob Katter (born 1945), politician
 Bob Katter Sr. (1918–1990), politician
 Carl Katter (born 1978), activist
 Katter's Australian Party
 Robbie Katter (born 1977), politician
 Thomas Katter (born 1959), musician

See also
 Ketter